Zema is both a surname and a given name. Notable people with the name include:

 Zema Abbey (born 1977), English former professional footballer
 Romeu Zema, Brazilian businessman
 Karim Ben Zema, French professional footballer
 Abdullah Abu Zema, Jordanian association football coach

Other uses 

 Ethiopian chant, liturgical song also called a Zema